Cristina D'Avena (born 6 July 1964) is an Italian actress, singer and television personality. She has sold nearly 7 million copies of her albums.

D'Avena was selected to join the prestigious Institute of Antoniano choir, following her debut, Lo Zecchino d'Oro, at age three. In the early 1980s, she sang numerous anime theme songs, which were compiled into several successful albums. Around the same time, D'Avena made her debut as an actress. In 1986, she appeared in Love me Licia, an Italian adaption of the Japanese manga Ai Shite Knight. D'Avena has been performing concerts in Italy since the late 1990s.

In 2010, D'Avena returned to recording and releasing music. Her works include the chart-topping album Duets, which featured several Italian singers and songwriters, notably: J-Ax, Giusy Ferreri, Francesca Michielin, Loredana Bertè, Baby K, Arisa, Annalisa, Emma, Michele Bravi, Elio, Noemi, Benji & Fede, Chiara, and Ermal Meta. D'Avena has also written two children's books.

Career

Music career and theme songs for animated series 
D'Avena's main line of work is recording theme songs for animated series. Overall, she has sung 743 songs, including theme songs for Sailor Moon, Kimagure Orange Road, Ai Shite Knight, Marmalade Boy, Ace o Nerae!, Touch, Pokémon, Attack No. 1, One Piece, Candy Candy, La Seine no Hoshi, Magic Knight Rayearth, Dr. Slump, Nadia: The Secret of Blue Water, Himitsu no Akko-chan, Little Women, Wedding Peach, Attacker You!, Glass Mask, Cardcaptor Sakura, Princess Sarah and Rose of Versailles. Cristina has also recorded songs for other television programs. The dubbed Italian songs she sings are not covers of the Japanese songs but newly written songs for the Italian dub of the anime. For the Italian dub of Mahou no Tenshi Creamy Mami, D'Avena both performed the theme songs and dubbed the singing voices of character Creamy Mami and her rival Megumi Ayase. D'Avena has performed themes for live-action TV series and Western cartoon series such as Batman: The Animated Series, Count Duckula, The Mask, My Little Pony and Friends, The Smurfs, The Magic School Bus, The Snorks, Totally Spies, and Jem.

In December 2009, D'Avena released her Magia di Natale album, which includes 12 traditional Christmas songs, all arranged by Valeriano Chiaravalle. In this album, she sang in English for the first time. She also paid homage to the recently deceased Michael Jackson by including a cover of his song "Childhood". She later released another album dedicated to Christmas as well as special albums commemorating her 30th year in the music industry.

D'Avena has presented stories and created fairy tales through VHS tapes, and audio CDs for De Agostini and other editions. 

On 10 November 2017, following her contract with Warner Music Italy, she released her 76th album, Duets – Tutti cantano Cristina, which includes songs with Italian artists including Loredana Bertè, Emma Marrone, J-Ax, Giusy Ferreri, Annalisa, Francesca Michielin, Arisa and Michele Bravi. The album became her first number one album and received the platinum certification by Fimi.

On 23 November 2018, her 77th studio album Duets Forever – Tutti cantano Cristina was released, containing 16 duets with many singer-songwriters of Italian music, such as Elisa, Patty Pravo, Carmen Consoli, Federica Carta, Elodie, Max Pezzali and Alessandra Amoroso. The album reached number three on the Italian Albums Chart, and is certified gold.

Acting and television programs 
D'Avena performed the Italian theme song for the anime series, Ai Shite Knight (known in Italy as Kiss Me Licia). She also starred as the female lead, Licia (Yakko-chan), in four live-action drama sequels: Love me Licia, Licia, dolce Licia, Teneramente Licia, and Balliamo e cantiamo con Licia.

A four-season telefilm was created about D'Avena: Arriva Cristina, Cristina, Cri Cri and Cristina, l' Europa siamo noi. They were also hugely successful in the 1990s.

Cristina has been the presenter and the special guest of many TV programs for children, such as Holyday on Ice, Sabato al Circo, Luna Party, L' Allegria fa '90, Bim Bum Bam, Buona Domenica, I Fatti Vostri, Lo Zecchino d' Oro, Game Boat, and Matricole e Meteore.

After co-hosting the TV program Matricole e Meteore for Canale 5, from 2012 to 2013 D'Avena hosted two music-themed programs on the TV channel Super!. In 2014, she was the voice of Beatrice in the Italian dub of Over the Garden Wall. She was a special guest in the 2016 edition of the Festival of Sanremo and was cast for the comedy TV program Colorado. On 16 February 2018, D'Avena returned to television as a member of the jury on the first edition of Sanremo Giovani, a teenage talent show hosted by Antonella Clerici.

Discography

Albums

Singles

Songs

Filmography

Films

Television

See also
 The Smurfs music
 Zecchino d'Oro
 Piccolo Coro dell'Antoniano

References

External links

  

1964 births
Living people
Italian women singers
Italian television personalities
Mass media people from Bologna
Anime musicians
Zecchino d'Oro singers
Musicians from Bologna